On August 4, 2019, 24-year-old Connor Betts shot and killed nine people, including his transgender brother, and wounded 17 others near the entrance of the Ned Peppers Bar in the Oregon District of Dayton, Ohio. Betts was fatally shot by responding police officers 32 seconds after the first shots were fired. A total of 27 people were taken to area hospitals.

A search of the shooter's home found evidence that showed an interest in violence and mass shootings and that he had expressed a desire to commit one. Despite describing himself as a leftist and voicing his support for Antifa, a preliminary assessment did not indicate that Betts had a racial or political motive. The attack occurred just 13 hours after a mass shooting in El Paso, Texas.

Shooting

Two hours before the shooting the gunman was seen entering a bar with his brother and a friend in the downtown Oregon Historic District of Dayton. At about 12:13 a.m. he split from the two and was recorded leaving the bar.

At 1:05 a.m. eyewitnesses reported that a man opened fire at the entrance of Ned Peppers Bar in the Oregon Historic District. He was carrying a firearm that included part of a semi-automatic Anderson Manufacturing AM-15 (based on the AR-15) in a pistol configuration with a shortened barrel, chambered in .223-caliber ammunition and equipped with a 100-round drum magazine. He fired 41 rounds into the crowd in less than 30 seconds, fatally shooting nine people and wounding 17 others. An additional 10 people were injured by other causes, bringing the total number of injured to 27.

According to Dayton Police Chief Richard Biehl, 20 seconds after the shooting began, law enforcement officers were already on the scene and engaged with the gunman. Within 32 seconds of the first shots being fired, the gunman was shot dead. An autopsy report released on December 6 showed that Betts was hit with 30 rounds. Police evacuated many nearby night venues and warned Dayton residents to stay away from the Oregon Historic District.

Victims

Miami Valley Hospital received 16 victims from the shooting, of which five were admitted, with one in critical condition. Kettering Health Network, comprising nine hospitals in the area, received nine victims, with three in serious condition and three in fair condition. By 10:00 a.m. on the same day, 15 of 27 hospitalized people had been discharged.

Police reported that all the fatalities occurred outside the bar on East 5th Street,. The nine dead include six men and three women, six black and three white. Four of the dead were in their 20s, four more were in their 30s and one was 57. Two of the victims who died were also shot by police. An autopsy showed that a woman who was shot by Betts was already bleeding from a fatal gunshot wound when she was struck by two bullets that were fired by police. Had she not been suffering from fatal injuries, one of the bullets fired by police would not have been lethal. The second victim was shot by Betts multiple times and sustained a superficial gunshot wound from police. As a result of those findings, Montgomery County Coroner Dr. Kent Harshbarger ruled that the deaths were caused by Betts and were not the result of police gunfire.

Perpetrator
Soon after the attack, police identified the gunman as Connor Stephen Betts, a 24-year-old who lived in Bellbrook, Ohio.  According to police, he had minor traffic offenses on his record.

Betts made online references about Satan and described himself as a leftist and antifa sympathizer. In the hours before he opened fire in Dayton, he "liked" a post in favor of gun control, and several concerning the El Paso shooting, including a tweet that called the El Paso shooter a "terrorist" and a "white supremacist". Betts was also known to have been in support of presidential candidates Bernie Sanders and Elizabeth Warren. An investigation concluded by the FBI in 2021 found that Betts "acted alone and was not directed by any organization or aligned to any specific ideological group," and that he "fantasized about mass shootings, serial killings, and murder-suicide for at least a decade".

Two former high school classmates said Betts was suspended from Bellbrook High School after he made lists of other students he wanted to kill and rape. The "hit list" was discovered in 2010 and resulted in a police investigation. He was previously bullied and had planned to shoot up the school, a classmate said. His high school girlfriend said he complained of visual and auditory hallucinations and psychosis, and was afraid of developing schizophrenia.

Investigation
On August 4, police and the FBI searched the shooter's home and found evidence that showed an interest in violence and mass shootings and that he had expressed a desire to commit a mass shooting. A preliminary assessment did not indicate the shooter had a racial or political motive. , police investigators stated that the investigation is ongoing and that they are not prepared to speculate about motivation. On August 5, Dayton Police Chief Richard Biehl stated that: "We have a lot of evidence still to go through ... based on where we're at now, we are not seeing any indication of race being a motive." Investigators are divided and have not determined whether he shot his sibling deliberately. A federal law enforcement official said that they were looking at whether the suspect was associated with incel groups.

The suspect had additional ammunition magazines with him, and was wearing body armor, a mask and hearing protection during the attack. He ordered the firearm used in the shooting online from Texas, and the firearm was transferred to a local firearms dealer in Ohio, where he picked it up. The firearm used was "modified in essence to function like a rifle", according to the Dayton Police; photos released by the Dayton Police show an AR-15 style firearm with a pistol brace.

On August 15, the Montgomery County Coroner announced that Betts had cocaine, alcohol, and Xanax in his system; and he also had a vape pen and a baggie containing cocaine in one of his pockets.

Aftermath

Members of the Southwest Ohio Critical Incident Stress Management Team and the Greater Montgomery County CISM team met with police who had responded to the scene to help them process the situation. The team includes mental health professionals, police officers, firefighters, medics, and chaplains.

The local blood bank asked for more donations following the shooting, and various companies promoted donation drives. Local leaders and community members held a vigil on East 5th Street on August 4, where ten doves were released, one each for each dead victim and one for the injured.

Reactions

Domestic

Following the shooting, Ned Peppers Bar posted a message on Instagram reading: "All of our staff is safe and our hearts go out to everyone involved as we gather information."

President Donald Trump tweeted, "God bless the people of El Paso Texas. God bless the people of Dayton, Ohio." In a later statement, he ordered that, following both shootings, all public U.S. flags be flown at half-staff until sunset on August 8. Regarding mass shootings, he said that the Trump Administration "have done much more than most administrations. We've actually done a lot. But perhaps more has to be done."

Mayor Nan Whaley thanked the officers for a quick response, saying that it certainly prevented more deaths. She also spoke of how hard the day would be for the city and the families affected. Ohio Senator Rob Portman and Governor Mike DeWine offered their condolences.

Senator Sherrod Brown, a Democrat representing Ohio, said "Thoughts and prayers are not enough. We must act." He urged Senate Majority Leader Mitch McConnell, a Republican, to start a United States Senate session on August 5 to "vote on gun-safety laws". Senate Minority Leader, Chuck Schumer, a Democrat, made a similar call to action. He referenced H.R.8, the Bipartisan Background Checks Act of 2019 that had passed the United States House of Representatives earlier in February, saying the Senate should also pass this. Representative Ted Lieu, a Democrat, asserted that McConnell was "blocking" the bipartisan proposal on "common sense gun safety legislation" from being voted on in the Senate.

Ohio House of Representatives member Candice Keller posted an essay on her personal Facebook page, blaming the shooting on several factors including recreational marijuana and the breakdown of the traditional family (due to causes including transgender rights). Her statement was criticized by Cincinnati City Council member Chris Seelbach, Butler County Sheriff Richard K. Jones, and Ohio Republican Party chairwoman Jane Timken (who called on her to resign).

Following the El Paso shooting, which occurred 13 hours prior, multiple Democratic 2020 presidential election candidates called for political action to eliminate gun violence in the United States; they included Cory Booker, Pete Buttigieg, Tim Ryan, Bernie Sanders, Elizabeth Warren, and Andrew Yang.

President Trump visited El Paso and Dayton on August 7. In Dayton, he spoke to hospitalized victims, medical staff, and first responders. The White House published photos and videos of his trip, some of which showed him posing, smiling, and giving thumbs up gestures with his hosts. He told reporters, "We had an amazing day. The love, the respect for the office of the presidency  I wish you could have been in there to see it."

Comedian Dave Chappelle hosted a free concert for Dayton three weeks after the shootings to honor the victims and their families. More than 20,000 were estimated at the event, which included performances from artists such as Stevie Wonder, Jon Stewart, and Chance the Rapper.

Dayton NAACP President Derrick Foward honored the six Dayton Police Officers with Hero Awards for courageously risking their lives to expeditiously respond to the mass shooting. The Officers accepted the awards during the Dayton Unit NAACP 68th Annual Freedom Fund Banquet.

International
The incident was mentioned by Pope Francis during a speech in St. Peter's Square on August 4, in which he condemned attacks on defenseless people and said he was spiritually close to the victims and the families affected by the attacks that had "bloodied Texas, California, and Ohio".

In response to the shooting, the Consulate General of Japan in Detroit issued a notice stating that no Asians had been injured and that "Japanese residents should be aware of the potential for gunfire incidents everywhere in the United States, a gun society, and continue to pay close attention to safety measures." At least two other nations – Uruguay and Venezuela — issued similar travel warnings, with Uruguay's foreign ministry issuing a statement warning its citizens traveling in the U.S. "to take precautions against growing indiscriminate violence, mostly for hate crimes, including racism and discrimination", and Venezuela cautioning its citizens to postpone travel to the U.S. or to take precautions "given the proliferation of acts of violence and crimes of indiscriminate hatred".

See also

List of mass shootings in the United States
Mass shootings in the United States
Gun violence in the United States

References

External links
 The New York Times list of victims fatally shot
 

2019 active shooter incidents in the United States
2019 in Ohio
2019 mass shootings in the United States
2019 murders in the United States
2010s crimes in Ohio
Articles containing video clips
Attacks on bars
August 2019 crimes in the United States
Deaths by firearm in Ohio
Fratricides
History of Dayton, Ohio
Violence against LGBT people in the United States
Mass murder in 2019
Mass murder in the United States
Massacres in the United States
Mass shootings in Ohio
Mass shootings in the United States
Murder in Ohio